Ahmed Soliman (born 11 December 1965) is a former Egyptian basketball player. Soliman competed for Egypt at the 1988 Summer Olympics, where he scored 4 points in 4 games.

References

1965 births
Living people
Olympic basketball players of Egypt
Basketball players at the 1988 Summer Olympics